Shreeram Bhinchar (born 7 June 1955) is an Indian politician from Rajasthan. He was elected Member of 14th Legislative Assembly of Rajasthan.Though education is only class 10 with 43%, He is very sharp politician who is expert in caste politics and vote calculations. He has changed political parties for contesting elections befitting the political situation. Is known to be a strong supporter of Vasundhara Raje camp. He is a Businessman and Farmer by profession.

Membership of Committee
 Member, Question & Reference Committee (2014-2015)
 Member, Question & Reference Committee (2015-2016)
 Member, Question & Reference Committee (2016-2017)
 Member, Question & Reference Committee (2017-2018)
 Member, Question & Reference Committee (2018-2019)

References

Living people
1955 births
Bharatiya Janata Party politicians from Rajasthan